Per-Anders Persson (born 7 March 1953) is a Swedish bobsledder. He competed in the two man event at the 1988 Winter Olympics.

References

External links
 

1953 births
Living people
Swedish male bobsledders
Olympic bobsledders of Sweden
Bobsledders at the 1988 Winter Olympics
People from Karlshamn
Sportspeople from Blekinge County
20th-century Swedish people